Ernst Dubbink (born 9 November 1988) is a Dutch motorcycle racer. He won the ONK Dutch 125cc Championship in 2007 and the ONK Dutch Moto3 Championship in 2014. He races in the ADAC Northern Europe Moto3 Cup aboard a Honda NSF250R.

Career statistics

Grand Prix motorcycle racing

By season

Races by year
(key)

References

External links
 Profile on MotoGP.com

1988 births
Dutch motorcycle racers
Living people
125cc World Championship riders
21st-century Dutch people